The PolyGame Master (PGM) is an arcade system board released in 1997 by the Taiwan company IGS. The PGM was developed in order to compete with the likes of SNK's Neo Geo MVS system in Taiwan. It was succeeded by PGM2 in 2007, and PGM3 in 2012.

DoDonPachi II, released by CAVE, came on a single dedicated board and utilizes a customized BIOS programmed by CAVE.
Ketsui and Espgaluda, again released by CAVE, came on a single dedicated board, but did not have a separate BIOS, as these functions are integrated into the main program.

IGS PolyGame Master

Description

The IGS PolyGame Master is an arcade system released by IGS in 1997. It features many video games, the most notable of which are the titles from the Knights of Valour series.

System specifications
 Main processor: Motorola 68000, running at 20 MHz
 Sound processor: Zilog Z80, running at 8.468 MHz
 Sound chip: ICS2115; 32 channel PCM
 Protection chip: ARM7 ASIC with internal code, running at 20 MHz
 Hardware features: 1 scrolling 8×8 tiles 4bpp scrolling tilemap, 32×32 tiles 5bpp scrolling tilemap with linescroll, arbitrary size 5bpp sprites, zoom and shrink capabilities

IGS PolyGame Master 2

Description
The IGS PolyGame Master 2 is an arcade system released by IGS in 2007, succeeding the IGS PolyGame Master. It features few video games, the most notable of which being the game Knights of Valour 3 from the Knights of Valour series.

System specifications
 Main processor: IGS036 (differs per game, internal code)
 Graphic processor: IGS037
 Sound chip: Yamaha YMZ774-S
 Protection chip: R5F21256SN (extra MCU for protection and IC Card communication)
 Media: ROM (Custom program ROM module (KOV3 only))

IGS PolyGame Master 3

Description

System specifications
 Main processor: ARM1176
 Chipset: Xing Xing SOC38
 RAM: 2 GB
 Media: SD Card (capacity max to 1 GB)

List of games

For PGM

For PGM2

For PGM3

References

External links
 PGM at System 16
 PGM at UVList
 PGM at Arcade Otaku wiki
 PGM 2 at System 16
 PGM 2 at Arcade Otaku wiki
 PGM 3 at Arcade Otaku wiki

Arcade system boards
x86-based computers
68k-based arcade system boards